Tender Pumpkins or Tender Little Pumpkins (Spanish: Calabacitas tiernas) is a 1949 Mexican comedy film directed by Gilberto Martínez Solares and starring Germán Valdés, Rosita Quintana and Nelly Montiel. This film marked the acting debut of Ramón Valdés, known mainly for portraying Don Ramón in the sitcom El Chavo del Ocho.

Cast
 Germán Valdés as Tin Tan  
 Rosita Quintana as Lupe  
 Nelly Montiel as Nelly  
 Jorge Reyes as Reyes  
 Gloria Alonso as Gloria  
 Nicolás Rodríguez as Guitarist  
 Francisco Reiguera as El muerto  
 Juan Orraca as Architect  
 Julián de Meriche as Representative  
 Francisco Pando as Don Gumersindo  
 Ramón Valdés as Willy  
 Mario Castillo as Crew member  
 Amalia Aguilar as Amalia  
 Rosina Pagã as Rosina 
 Marcelo Chávez as Marcelo 
 Ramón Gay as Announcer

References

Bibliography 
 Mora, Carl J. Mexican Cinema: Reflections of a Society, 1896-2004. McFarland & Co, 2005.

External links 
 

1949 films
1949 comedy films
Mexican comedy films
1940s Spanish-language films
Films directed by Gilberto Martínez Solares
Mexican black-and-white films
1940s Mexican films